Shamu may refer to:

 Shamu, the first orca (killer whale) to survive more than 13 months in captivity
 Shamu (SeaWorld show), the SeaWorld (U.S.) killer whale shows named for SeaWorld's first orca
 Shammu (born 1992), Indian film actress and model
 Webster Shamu (born 1945), Zimbabwean politician, currently serving as Minister of Publicity and Information.
 Google Nexus 6, an Android device with the codename shamu.

See also
 Shamoo (disambiguation) 
 Shamus (disambiguation) 
 Shamu Express, a steel roller coaster at SeaWorld Orlando
 Shamu Salavi, a village in West Azerbaijan Province, Iran.